Nigel Paul Gibbens  (born 1 March 1958) is a British veterinarian and civil servant. He was the United Kingdom's Chief Veterinary Officer from May 2008 to March 2018.

Early life and education
Gibbens was born on 1 March 1958 in Dover, Kent, England. He studied at the Royal Veterinary College, graduating with a Bachelor of Veterinary Medicine degree.

Career
On 21 May 2008, Gibbens became the Chief Veterinary Officer of the United Kingdom and for the Department for Environment, Food and Rural Affairs.

Gibbens supports the culling of badgers in an attempt to control the spread of bovine tuberculosis, describing the practice as "the best available option".

Honours
He was appointed Commander of the Order of the British Empire in the 2016 New Year Honours.

References

British veterinarians
Living people
Commanders of the Order of the British Empire
1958 births
People from Dover, Kent